Dhading Besi is a town (neighborhood) and the district headquarter of the Dhading District of Nepal. The town is located within Nilkantha Municipality one of two municipalities of the district. It is also the administrative center of Nilkantha Municipality. The district also holds the major administrative buildings and structures of the district.

Etymology
The word besi in the Nepali language means lowlands in the river basin, the reason many people settled here. It is a small town along the banks of two rivers, Arun Khola and Thopal Khola (Khola means a small river in Nepali).

Main settlement of the Nilkantha municipality is Puchhar Bazaar, Bich Bazaar, Milan Tole and Siran Bazaar. Being a district headquarters, most of the government offices are located in the area. It is connected to Kathmandu, Chitwan, Rasuwa, Nuwakot, Pokhara and the rest of Nepal via all weather motorable district feeder road connecting to Prithvi Highway.

It is at 27°54'45.9"N 84°53'46.2"E at an altitude of 612 metres.

See also
 Dhading District
 Nepal
 Bagmati Zone

References

 Cohen, Saul B.; ed. The Columbia Gazetteer of the World (New York: Columbia University Press, 1998) p. 827

Populated places in Dhading District